The Rectory on the island of Rota in the Northern Mariana Islands is a rare example of transitional Spanish-Japanese architecture in the archipelago, now a United States commonwealth. It was built about 1930, during the South Seas Mandate period of Japanese administration, when the native Chamorro people were displaced to this area by workers imported by the Japanese to work in the sugar fields. Although only the concrete frame remains, elements such as its massive steps and window placement are typical of the earlier Spanish period, while decorative elements such as its porch columns and window opening details are distinctly Japanese.

The structure was listed on the National Register of Historic Places in 1981.

See also
National Register of Historic Places listings in the Northern Mariana Islands

References

National Register of Historic Places in the Northern Mariana Islands
Buildings and structures completed in 1930
Rota (island)